Birdman Records is an independent record label based in South San Francisco, California, that was founded in 2000 by David Katznelson, former A&R vice president of Warner Bros. Records.

History
Birdman Records is the flagship label of the Birdman Recording Group, which includes Sepia Tone Records, Tornado Records, and Tariff Records. The label was founded in 2000 after the departure of David Katznelson from Warner Bros. Records.

In addition to its focus on particular artists, the label produced More Oar: A Tribute to the Skip Spence Album, a 1999 tribute album to the late Skip Spence, featuring contributions from Robert Plant, Beck and Tom Waits, among others, with the objective at the time of funding Spence's medical care. Spence died shortly before the release of the record, but is reported to have heard some or all of it prior to his death. Katznelson was the executive producer of the album.

Roster
 A.D A.K.A Club V.I.P
 Apache
 The Apes
 Boredoms
 Brother JT
 Ralph Carney
 The Cuts
 Charlie Dee
 The Electric Prunes
 Fat Nigger G
 Foetus
 Paula Frazer
 John Frusciante
 Brian Glaze
 The Gris Gris
 Branman Howe
 Howlin Rain
 Jacuzzi Woodside
 Modey Lemon
 The Nice Boys
 PFFR
 The Spider Bags
 The Time Flys
 Othar Turner
 Young Jazz Giants

See also
 List of record labels

References

External links
 Official site

2000 establishments in California
Alternative rock record labels
American companies established in 2000
American independent record labels
Companies based in South San Francisco, California
Music of the San Francisco Bay Area
Record labels based in California
Record labels established in 2000